Gloucestershire Health and Care NHS Foundation Trust is an NHS foundation trust which provides physical health, mental health and learning disability services throughout Gloucestershire.

The trust was formed on 1 October 2019 by the merger of 2gether NHS Foundation Trust and Gloucestershire Care Services NHS Trust.

References

External links 

NHS foundation trusts
Health in Gloucestershire
Health in Herefordshire